Licor 43 was a Spanish professional cycling team that existed from 1958 to 1964. It was sponsored by the Spanish liqueur brand Licor 43. Antonio Suárez won the general classification of the 1959 Vuelta a España with the team.

References

Cycling teams based in Spain
Defunct cycling teams based in Spain
1958 establishments in Spain
1964 disestablishments in Spain
Cycling teams established in 1958
Cycling teams disestablished in 1964